Dead Man's Hand is a 2002 Luxembourgian drama film directed by Laurent Brandenburger and Philippe Boon. It was selected as the Luxembourgish entry for the Best Foreign Language Film at the 75th Academy Awards, but it was not nominated.

Cast
 Albert Dupontel as Jean
 Marie Trintignant as Nicole
 Serge Larivière as Georges
 Bouli Lanners as Eddy

See also
 List of submissions to the 75th Academy Awards for Best Foreign Language Film
 List of Luxembourgish submissions for the Academy Award for Best Foreign Language Film

References

External links
 

2002 films
2002 drama films
2000s French-language films
Luxembourgian drama films
French-language Luxembourgian films